The Peeresses Act 1441 (20 Hen 6 c 9) was an Act of the Parliament of England. It is sometimes referred to as the Peeresses Act 1442 or the Trial of Peeresses Act 1441 or 1442

The whole Act was repealed by section 81 of, and Part III of Schedule 10 to, the Criminal Justice Act 1948.

The 20 Hen 6, of which this chapter was part, was repealed for the Republic of Ireland by section 1 of, and Part 2 of the Schedule to, the Statute Law Revision Act 1983.

References
Halsbury's Statutes,

External links
List of repeals in the Republic of Ireland from the Irish Statute Book.

Acts of the Parliament of England
1440s in law
1441 in England